Lövsele is a village in Lövånger socken in Skellefteå Municipality, Västerbotten County, Sweden.

History
Until 1951, the village's name was Kräkånger. Kräk is thought to be derived from a dialectal word meaning "sharp angle" or "small bay", and is related to modern Swedish krok ("hook") and krök ("bend"), while ånger in Swedish place names typically means "bay". The name may refer to the bay which historically (around 500AD) stretched from Lövånger to Bureå, forming a sharp angle with what was at the time the Lövånger Fjard.

As cars were becoming commonplace in the 1940s, the name, and that of neighbouring village Kräkångersnoret (now Södra Lövsele), attracted ridicule from visitors due to the modern Swedish associations it suggests: kräk[as] means "[to] vomit", ånger means "regret", and snor[et] means "[the] snot". As a result, the local population expressed their wishes to change the name, and the new name Lövsele was formed from sele, referring to the nearby lake Selet (the remnants of the fjard from which the earlier name had been derived), and löv, referring to Lövånger parish.

References

Populated places in Skellefteå Municipality